The 2016 Missouri Democratic presidential primary took place on March 15 in the U.S. state of Missouri as one of the Democratic Party's primaries ahead of the 2016 United States presidential election.

On the same day, the Democratic Party held primaries in Florida, Illinois, North Carolina and Ohio, while the Republican Party held primaries in the same five states, including their own Missouri primary, plus the Northern Mariana Islands.

Opinion polling

Results

Clinton went into election night in Missouri down to Senator Sanders in the polls. Throughout the evening Sanders maintained a lead over Clinton. However St. Louis County and Jackson County, home of a large section of Kansas City, came in late and it was just enough to push Clinton over the finish line. Senator Sanders refused to request a recount citing concerns over wasting taxpayer dollars.

Results by county

Analysis
Hillary Clinton, having narrowly lost the Missouri primary to Barack Obama eight years prior, managed a slim 0.2-percentage-point-victory over an increasingly popular insurgent Bernie Sanders in 2016. With Sanders winning men 56-44, voters under the age of 45 67-32, and white voters 54-45, Clinton won among women 54-44, older voters 62-37, and African American voters 67-32.

Sanders won among voters who made less than $50k and $100k per year, with Clinton winning more affluent voters. And while Sanders won 67-33 among self-identified Independents who made up 24% of the electorate, Clinton won 55-44 among the 74% of voters who identified as Democrats. While Sanders won among liberals 53-46, Clinton won moderates and conservatives 55-44. Sanders was able to win 54-45 among union households, a key voting bloc in the industrial Midwest, and he won 53-46 among those who believe trade with other countries takes away U.S. jobs; trade deals championed by Bill and Hillary Clinton have not always gone over well in the industrial Rust Belt. In terms of each voters' family financial situation, voters who were "getting ahead" or "holding steady" opted for Clinton, while those who felt they were "falling behind" overwhelmingly favored Sanders.

Clinton won a large victory in St. Louis City and St. Louis County (she won 55-44 according to exit polls, likely thanks to her ardent African American support), and she also managed a 51-48 victory in Kansas City on the western side of the state. Sanders, meanwhile, won victories in Columbia and Springfield, keeping the race close statewide, and won in the largely white, rural and more conservative counties, including areas of Northwestern Missouri bordering Kansas and Nebraska, and Southwestern Missouri bordering Oklahoma. All three neighboring states are Great Plains states that Sanders won earlier in March.

See also
 2016 Missouri Republican presidential primary

References

Missouri
Democratic primary
2016